This is a list of the longest running United States cable television series, ordered by number of broadcast seasons.

To qualify for this list, the programming must originate in North America and shown nationally in the United States and be first-run (as opposed to a repackaging of previously aired material or material released in other media). For the purposes of this list, series that were available only on a local or regional basis will be excluded, along with hybrid broadcast/cable networks such as The WB 100+/The CW Plus. For series that originated on U.S. broadcast networks (or broadcast syndication) and then was picked up by a national cable network, only the amount aired nationally on cable as original programming is represented here. A season for the purpose of this article is defined as a given year, not a production cycle (as in America's Next Top Model) which is defined as a season by the network or the program's distributor.

List

25 or more seasons

20–24 seasons

15–19 seasons

12–14 seasons

10–11 seasons

See also

Lists of longest running U.S. shows by broadcast type:
List of longest-running United States television series
List of longest-running U.S. broadcast network television series
List of longest-running U.S. primetime television series
List of longest-running U.S. first-run syndicated television series
Lists of longest running shows internationally:
List of longest-running television shows by category- international list
List of longest-running UK television series
List of longest-running Australian television series
List of shortest running shows:
List of television series canceled after one episode
List of television series canceled before airing an episode

References

Longest running cable
 
Cable
US cable